WMPI (105.3 FM) is a radio station  broadcasting a country music format. Licensed to Scottsburg, Indiana, United States, the station serves the Louisville, Kentucky, area.  The station is currently owned by D.R. Rice Broadcasting, Inc.

References

External links

MPI
MPI
Country radio stations in the United States